The Caucasian agama (Paralaudakia caucasia) is a species of agamid lizard found in the Caucasus, E/S Georgia, Armenia, Azerbaijan, Turkmenistan, Tajikistan, Dagestan (Russia), E Turkey, Iraq, N Iran, Afghanistan, NW Pakistan, and parts of Kashmir.

Description
Head much depressed; nostril lateral, below the canthus rostralis, slightly tubular. Upper head-scales smooth; occipital not enlarged; small conical spinose scales on the side of the head near the ear, and on the neck; ear larger than the eye-opening. Throat strongly plicate; no gular pouch. Body much depressed, with a very indistinct lateral fold; nuchal and latero-dorsal scales very small, granular; vertebral region with enlarged flat, feebly keeled, rather irregular scales; flanks with enlarged, strongly keeled or spinose scales; no nuchal denticulation; ventral scales smooth, distinctly smaller than the enlarged dorsals. 150 to 160 scales round the middle of the body. Limbs strong, with compressed digits; the scales on the upper surface of limbs much enlarged, strongly keeled, generally spinose; fourth finger slightly longer than third; fourth toe a little longer than third, fifth extending beyond first. Tail rounded, depressed at the base, covered with rather large spinose scales arranged in rings, two rings forming a distinct segment; the length of the tail doos not equal quite twice the distance from gular fold to vent. Male with a large patch of callose preanal scales and an enormous patch of similar scales on the belly. Olivaceous above, with round yellowish black-edged spots, the black frequently forming a network; vertebral region yellowish, limbs with more or less distinct yellowish cross bars; lower surface yellowish in the female, blackish in the breeding male.

From snout to vent 5 inches.

Notes

References
 Ananjeva, N. B. and Orlova, V. F. 1979 Distribution and geographic variability of Agama caucasia (Eichwald, 1831) (in Russian). Proceedings of the Zoological Institute of the Academy of Sciences, U.S.S.R. 89, 4-17
 Ananjeva, N.B.; Atajev, J. 1984 Stellio caucasica triannulatus - A new Subspecies of the caucasian Agama from South- Western Turkmenia Trudy Zool. Inst. Akad. Nauk Sssr 124: 4-11
 Ananjeva, N.B. & Tuniev 1994 Some aspects of historical biogeography of Asian rock agamids Russ. J. Herpetol. 1 (1): 43
 Ananjeva, N. & Orlov, N. 2005 Lizards of North Eurasia. Reptilia (GB) (38): 54-63
 Eichwald, E. 1831 Zoologia specialis, quam expositis animalibus tum vivis, tum fossilibus potissimuni rossiae in universum, et poloniae in specie, in usum lectionum publicarum in Universitate Caesarea Vilnensi. Zawadski, Vilnae.

External links
 
 https://web.archive.org/web/20070110031253/http://itgmv1.fzk.de/www/itg/uetz/herp/photos/Laudakia_caucasia.jpg
Laudakia caucasia at The Checklist of Armenia's Amphibians and Reptiles at Tadevosyan's Herpetological Resources. Accessed 30 March 2007.

Reptiles of Azerbaijan
Reptiles of Pakistan
Reptiles of Afghanistan
Reptiles of Central Asia
Reptiles of Russia
Reptiles described in 1831
Taxa named by Karl Eichwald
Paralaudakia